Paul Henrichsen (2 September 1893 – 5 August 1962) was a Norwegian cyclist. He competed in two events at the 1912 Summer Olympics and two events at the 1920 Summer Olympics.

References

External links
 

1893 births
1962 deaths
Norwegian male cyclists
Olympic cyclists of Norway
Cyclists at the 1912 Summer Olympics
Cyclists at the 1920 Summer Olympics
Sportspeople from Fredrikstad